The International Congress of Linguists (ICL) takes place every five years, under the governance of the Permanent International Committee of Linguists (PICL) / Comité International Permanent des Linguistes (CIPL). The 19th ICL was held in Geneva, Switzerland in 2013. The 20th ICL was held in Cape Town, South Africa from 2–6 July 2018 and will be on the topic of "The Diversity of Language".  The next (21st) ICL  was originally planned to take place in Kazan (Tatarstan), Russia) from 25 June to 2 July 2023. However, due to the Russian invasion in Ukraine, the venue was changed and the congress moved by one year. It is now planned to take place in Poznań at the Adam Mickiewicz University, 22-28 September 2024.

19th International Congress of Linguists 
The Swiss Linguistics Society (SSG) proposed that the 19th congress would be organized in Ferdinand de Saussure’s city Geneva, one century after his death to commemorate on his important contributions to the field of linguistics. The events took place from July 21 to July 27, 2013.

The 19th ICL was about the language-cognition interface, a topic of cognitive linguistics based on the foundational work of Ferdinand de Saussure, a Swiss linguist who is widely considered one of the fathers of 20th-century linguistics. During the Congress, several sessions were held about major aspects of linguistics, including the origin of language, phonology, morphology, syntax, semantics, pragmatics, psycholinguistics, and sociolinguistics.

Previous venues 
The 18th International Congress of Linguists took place in 2008 in the city of Seoul, South Korea.

The ICL was started in April 1928 in The Hague where it organized its first edition, and subsequent editions have been held in cities such as Geneva in 1931, Rome in 1933 and Copenhagen in 1936. The first congress has been read as marking an intellectual split of the emergent discipline of linguistics from traditional philology, though in 1952, the seventh congress was held in London, hosted by the Philological Society. A more recent congress took place in Paris in 1997.

See also
 List of linguistics conferences

References 

Linguistics conferences